Sphaerobasidium is a genus of corticioid fungi in the family Hydnodontaceae. The widely distributed genus contains four species.

References

Trechisporales
Trechisporales genera
Taxa named by Franz Oberwinkler
Taxa described in 1965